Lambula plicata is a moth of the family Erebidae. It was described by George Hampson in 1900. It is only known from the holotype, which was collected near Fakfak on New Guinea.

References

 

Lithosiina
Moths described in 1900